Lawrence Lyle "Pete" Naaden (born August 14, 1927), is an American former politician who was a member of the North Dakota State Senate. He represented the 30th district from 1973 to 2000 as a member of the Republican party. A farmer and rancher; he owns a family ranch at Braddock, North Dakota.

References

1927 births
Possibly living people
Republican Party North Dakota state senators
Farmers from North Dakota